Robert Gray Elementary School can refer to:
 Robert R. Gray Elementary School - Prince George's County, Maryland - Prince George's County Public Schools
 Robert Gray Elementary School - Aberdeen, Washington - Aberdeen School District
 Robert Gray Elementary School - Longview, Washington - Longview Public Schools